Robert Galloway and Nathan Pasha were the defending champions but only Pasha chose to defend his title, partnering Max Schnur. Pasha successfully defended his title after defeating Harry Bourchier and Filip Peliwo 7–6(7–4), 6–3 in the final.

Seeds

Draw

References

External links
 Main draw

Calgary National Bank Challenger - Doubles
2020 Doubles